Black Ball Line or Blackball Line may refer to:

 Black Ball Line (trans-Atlantic packet), a fleet of packet ships running between Liverpool and New York, the first scheduled trans-Atlantic service, founded in 1817
 Black Ball Line (Liverpool), a fleet of packet ships running between Liverpool and Australia owned by James Baines & Co, founded in 1852
 Puget Sound Navigation Company, a fleet of ferries on Puget Sound and the Strait of Georgia in British Columbia and Washington known as the Black Ball Line, founded in 1898